Eupithecia satyrata, the satyr pug, is a species of moth of the family Geometridae. It was described by Jacob Hübner in 1813. It is found from Ireland, through northern and central Europe (from Scandinavia to the northern Mediterranean) east to all of Russia and central Asia and western Siberia to Tibet. It is also present in North Africa and North America.

Eupithecia satyrata is variable in pattern. The ground colour of the wings is ash grey or brownish. The veins often have a black with white dusting. There are paler crosslines. On the forewings a very indistinct terminal fascia ends in a tiny tornal spot. There is a fine discal spot on the forewing. This is absent on the hindwing. Prout gives an account of the variations.

Adults are on wing from March to September. There is one generation per year.

The larvae feed on the flowers of a wide range of plants, including Achillea, Scabiosa, Solidago, Senecio and Erica tetralix.

Subspecies
Eupithecia satyrata satyrata
Eupithecia satyrata callunaria Doubleday, 1850
Eupithecia satyrata curzoni Gregson, 1884
Eupithecia satyrata dodata Taylor, 1906
Eupithecia satyrata intimata Pearsall, 1908
Eupithecia satyrata juldusi Dietze, 1910
Eupithecia satyrata rivosulata Dietze, 1875 (Yakutia, Siberia)
Eupithecia satyrata subatrata Staudinger, 1871
Eupithecia satyrata zermattensis Wehrli, 1928

Similar species
Eupithecia intricata

References

External links

Butterflies and Moths of Northern Ireland
Lepiforum e.V.

Moths described in 1813
satyrata
Moths of Europe
Moths of Asia
Moths of Africa
Moths of North America
Taxa named by Jacob Hübner